Sibiu County is a county of Romania, in the historical region of Transylvania. Its county seat is the namesake town of Sibiu.

Name 

In Hungarian, it is known as Szeben megye, and in German as Kreis Hermannstadt. Under the Kingdom of Hungary, a county with an identical name (Szeben County) was created in 1876.

Demographics 

At the 2011 census, the county has the following population indices:

 Romanians – 91.25% (or 340,836)
 Romani – 4.76% (or 17,901)
 Hungarians – 2.89% (or 10,893)
 Germans (Transylvanian Saxons) – 1.09% (or 4,117)
 Other – 0.1% (or 640)

Religion:

 Romanian Orthodox – 90.9%
 Greek Catholics – 2.3%
 Reformed – 2.0%
 Roman Catholics – 1.5%
 Pentecostals – 1.1%
 Baptists – 0.9%
 Other – 1.3%

Urbanisation – 5th most urbanised county in Romania:

 Urban dwellers: 277,574 (or 65.8%)
 Rural dwellers: 144,150 (or 34.2%)

Traditionally, the biggest minority in the county were Germans, but their numbers have decreased since World War II and especially after the Romanian Revolution of 1989.

The south side of the county, closer to the mountains was mainly inhabited by Romanians (Mărginimea Sibiului), and the north side of the country – the Transylvanian Plateau was inhabited evenly by Germans and Romanians, but most Saxon villages are now deserted by their original ethnic German population. The Roma population, mainly from southern Romania, was placed close to the villages in the communist period and have since increased their numbers, especially in the Hârtibaciu valley.

Most of the population is concentrated in the Sibiu metro area which has over 240 thousand inhabitants, with settlements like Șelimbăr, Cisnădie (especially the Arhitecților neighbourhood), Șura Mare, Șura Mica, Cristian and Roșia having grown in population in the last 15 years, both from internal migration from the county and from other areas, mainly Vâlcea county. Tălmaciu and Avrig are other towns in the area.

Another population centre is the second largest city, Mediaș, with a population of over 40 thousands, which forms a relatively higher density area than the sorrounding northern part of the county, with nearby towns Copșa Mică and Dumbrăveni and also communes like Bazna or Târnava.

Geography 

The Olt River crosses the mountains over to the South of Romania in Sibiu County, forming one of the most accessible links between Transylvania and Wallachia. In the North side there is the Transylvanian Plateau.

The most important rivers crossing the county are the Olt in the South with the Cibin as its main effluent, and the Târnava in the North.

Neighbours 

 Brașov County in the East.
 Alba County in the West.
 Mureș County in the North.
 Vâlcea County in the South.
 Argeș County in the South-East.

Economy 

Sibiu County has one of the most dynamic economies in Romania, and is one of the regions with the highest level of foreign investment.

The predominant industries in the county are:
 Machine and automotive components.
 Food industry.
 Textile industry.
 Wood industry.

The biggest natural resource in the county is natural gas, especially in the north side, having one of the largest sources in the country.

In Copșa Mică during the communist period there were two chemical industrial complexes which polluted the environment heavily with carbon black, heavy metals, and other chemical substances. The area is still considered one of the most polluted communities in Europe. After 1989 many of the industrial complexes were shut down and the area is slowly recovering.

Politics 

The regional legislature is the County Council. Its president was Martin Bottesch (FDGR/DFDR) from 2004 to 2012. The Sibiu County Council, renewed at the 2020 local elections, consists of 32 counsellors, with the following party composition:

Tourism 

The main tourist attractions in the county are:
 The city of Sibiu with its medieval fortifications and its historic centre.
 The medieval city of Mediaș.
 The medieval Saxon fortified churches and villages from Transylvania, some of them being UNESCO World Heritage Sites:
 Biertan.
 Valea Viilor.
 Cisnădie.
 Cisnădioara.
 Slimnic.
 Agnita.
 The abbey of Cârța
 The Făgăraș Mountains.
 The Bâlea Valley and the Transfăgărășan.
 The Negoiu Peak.
 Păltiniș mountain resort and the Cindrel Mountains.
 Ocna Sibiului, Bazna, and Miercurea Sibiului spa towns.
 The Mărginimea Sibiului rural area.

Natives 

 Emil Cioran
 Octavian Goga

Administrative divisions 

Sibiu County has 2 municipalities, 9 towns, and 53 communes
Municipalities
 Mediaș
 Sibiu - capital city; population: 137,026 (as of 2011)
Towns

 Agnita
 Avrig
 Cisnădie
 Copșa Mică
 Dumbrăveni
 Miercurea Sibiului
 Ocna Sibiului
 Săliște
 Tălmaciu

Communes

 Alma
 Alțâna
 Apoldu de Jos
 Arpașu de Jos
 Ațel
 Axente Sever
 Bazna
 Bârghiș
 Biertan
 Blăjel
 Boița
 Brateiu
 Brădeni
 Bruiu
 Chirpăr
 Cârța
 Cârțișoara
 Cristian
 Dârlos
 Gura Râului
 Hoghilag
 Iacobeni
 Jina
 Laslea
 Loamneș
 Ludoș
 Marpod
 Merghindeal
 Micăsasa
 Mihăileni
 Moșna
 Nocrich
 Orlat
 Păuca
 Poiana Sibiului
 Poplaca
 Porumbacu de Jos
 Racovița
 Rășinari
 Râu Sadului
 Roșia
 Sadu
 Slimnic
 Șeica Mare
 Șeica Mică
 Șelimbăr
 Șura Mare
 Șura Mică
 Tilișca
 Târnava
 Turnu Roșu
 Valea Viilor
 Vurpăr

Historical county 

Historically, the county was located in the central part of Greater Romania, in the southern part of the historical region of Transylvania. The capital was Sibiu.

The interwar county's territory included most of the southwestern portion of today's Sibiu County, excluding the area around Vizocna that belonged to former Hungarian subdivision of Alsó-Fehér County, and the communes of Agârbiciu, Buia, Frâua, Hașag, Șelca Mare, and Șelca Mică, which all belonged to Târnava Mare County. Sibiu County once contained the district around Sebeș, which passed in 1925 to Alba County.

It was bordered to the west by the counties of Hunedoara and Alba, to the north by the counties of Târnava-Mică and Târnava Mare, to the east by Făgăraș County, and to the south by the counties of Gorj and Vâlcea.

Administration 

The county originally consisted of the city of Sibiu and four districts (plăși):
Plasa Mercurea, headquartered at Mercurea
Plasa Ocna Sibiului, headquartered at Ocna Sibiului
Plasa Săliște, headquartered at Săliște
Plasa Sibiu, headquartered at Sibiu

A subsequent administrative division in 1937 had the county divided into the city of Sibiu and six districts:
Plasa Avrig, headquartered at Avrig
Plasa Mercurea, headquartered at Mercurea
Plasa Nocrich, headquartered at Nocrich
Plasa Ocna Sibiului, headquartered at Ocna Sibiului
Plasa Săliște, headquartered at Săliște
Plasa Sibiu, headquartered at Sibiu

Population 

According to the census data of 1930, the county's population was 194,619, of which 62.0% were Romanians, 29.3% Germans, 4.7% Hungarians, as well as other minorities. In the religious aspect, the population consisted of 52.0% Eastern Orthodox, 27.8% Lutheran, 12.7% Greek Catholic, 4.0% Roman Catholic, 2.2% Reformed (Calvinist), as well as other minorities.

Urban population 

In 1930, the urban population was ethnically divided as follows: 43.8% Germans, 37.7% Romanians, 13.2% Hungarians, 2.7% Jews, as well as other minorities. As a mother tongue in the urban population, German was spoken by 44.7% of the population, followed by Romanian (38.5%), Hungarian (13.7%), Yiddish (1.4%), as well as other minority languages.  From the religious point of view, the urban population was made up of 38.8% Lutheran, 31.5% Eastern Orthodox, 12.9% Roman Catholic, 7.5% Greek Catholic, 5.2% Reformed, 2.9% Jewish, as well as other minorities.

References

External links 

 
Counties of Romania
Geography of Transylvania
1925 establishments in Romania
1938 disestablishments in Romania
1945 establishments in Romania
1950 disestablishments in Romania
1968 establishments in Romania
States and territories established in 1925
States and territories disestablished in 1938
States and territories established in 1945
States and territories disestablished in 1950
States and territories established in 1968